Sansad Adarsh Gram Yojana (abbr.: SAGY) is a rural development programme broadly focusing upon the development in the villages which includes social development, cultural development and spread motivation among the people on social mobilization of the village community. The programme was launched by the Prime Minister of India, Narendra Modi on the birth anniversary of Jayaprakash Narayan, on 11 October 2014.

The distinct feature of this Yojana is that it is (a) demand driven (b) inspired by society (c) based on people's participation.

Objectives 
Key objectives of the Yojana include:
 The development of model villages, called Adarsh Grams, through the implementation of existing schemes, and certain new initiatives to be designed for the local context, which may vary from village to village.
 Creating models of local development which can be replicated in other villages.

The plan
Sansad Adarsh Gram Yojana was initiated to bring the member of parliament of all the political parties under the same umbrella while taking the responsibility of developing physical and institutional infrastructure in villages and turn them into model villages. Under this yojana, each member of parliament needs to choose one village each from the constituency that they represent, except their own village or their in-laws village and fix parameters and make it a model village by 2019.

Thereafter, they can take on two or three more villages and do the same by the time the next general elections come along in 2019, and thereafter, set themselves ten-year-long village or rural improvement projects. Villages will be offered smart schools, universal access to basic health facilities and Pucca housing to homeless villagers.

Funding 
No new funds are allocated to this Yojana and funds may be raised through :
 Funds from existing schemes, such as the Indira Awas Yojana, Pradhan Mantri Gram Sadak Yojana, Mahatma Gandhi National Rural Employment Guarantee Scheme, and Backward Regions Grant Fund, etc.,
 The Member of Parliament Local Area Development Scheme (MPLADS),
 The gram panchayat's own revenue,
 Central and State Finance Commission Grants, and
 Corporate Social Responsibility funds.

Roles and responsibilities of key functionaries

Strategies
In order to convert the identified village into an Adarsh Gram through the specified
activities, the following are the possible strategies:
 Entry point activities to energize and mobilize the community towards positive common action
 Participatory planning exercise for identifying peoples’ needs and priorities in an integrated manner
 Converging resources from Central Sector and Centrally Sponsored Schemes and also other State schemes to the extent possible.
 Repairing and renovating existing infrastructure to the extent possible.
 Strengthening the Gram Panchayats and peoples’ institutions within them
 Promoting transparency and accountability

Adopting Villages
List of villages adopted by MPs, State wise can be viewed here

http://saanjhi.gov.in/saanjhimis/reports/Dreports/SummarReport_chosenGP.aspx
or
http://www.mapsofindia.com/government-of-india/saansad-adarsh-gram-yojana.html

List of a few important adoptions :
 Under the scheme, Narendra Modi has adopted Jayapur village  his constituency Varanasi in Uttar Pradesh.
 PM Modi has adopted 6 villages as of now. His first four villages were Jayapur, Nagepur, Kakrahia and Domari. Recently PM Modi adopted 2 more villages, Poore Bariyarpur and Parampur. https://www.hindustantimes.com/cities/lucknow-news/pm-narendra-modi-to-adopt-two-more-villages-in-varanasi-101613446536903.html Y. S. Chowdary has adopted Ponnavaram village in Krishna district in Andhra Pradesh.
 Sonia Gandhi adopted Udwa village in her constituency Rae Bareli in Uttar Pradesh.
 Rahul Gandhi adopted Deeh village in his constituency Amethi in Uttar Pradesh.
 V. K. Singh adopted Mirpur Hindu in his constituency Ghaziabad, Uttar Pradesh.
 Ahmed Patel adopted Vandari village in Rajpipada, Gujarat.
 Sachin Tendulkar adopted Puttamraju vari Kandriga(P.R.Kandriga) a village near Gudur in Nellore district of  Andhra Pradesh. And Donja village in Osmanabad district of Marathwada, Maharastra.
 Harish Dwivedi adopted Amorha Khas village in Basti district, Uttar Pradesh.
 Kamal Nath adopted Bisapur Kalan village in Chhindwara district, Madhya Pradesh.

Performance
Under Phase 1 (2014–16) of the scheme, nearly 500 out of 543 Lok Sabha MPs and 203 out of 253 Rajya Sabha MPs adopted the village.  In Phase 2 (2016–18), the number dipped to 326 Lok Sabha MPs and 121 Rajya Sabha MPs adopting the village. The numbers dipped further in Phase 3 (2017–19). As of February 2018, only 97 Lok Sabha MPs and 27 Rajya Sabha MPs had adopted the village.

References

Sources

External links
 
 http://www.mapsofindia.com/government-of-india/saansad-adarsh-gram-yojana.html
 https://pmoschemes.in/sansad-adarsh-gram-yojana-in-hindi/

Rural development in India
2014 in India
Government schemes in India
Modi administration initiatives
Parliament of India